James Hoggan may refer to:
 James Hoggan (athlete)
 James Hoggan (public relations expert)